For the Pan American Games, there are 9 venues that have been or will be used for handball.

References

Venues
 
Pan American Games venues